Bovan is a village in Serbia situated in the  municipality of Aleksinac, in the Nišava District. Bovan has a population of 554 as recorded in the 2002 census.

External links

Populated places in Nišava District